The 26th Infantry Division was a pre-World War II German Infantry Division of the 1st mobilisation wave (1. Welle). It was mobilised for World War II on September 26, 1939, disbanded on September 10, 1944, near Radom and reformed as the 26th Volksgrenadier Division (26. Volksgrenadier-Division) on September 17, 1944, near Poznań by absorption of the new 582nd Volksgrenadier Division of the 32nd mobilisation wave (32. Welle). Remnants of the Division entered U.S. captivity in the Harz region in 1945.

Commanding officers
General der Infanterie Sigismund von Förster, 1 September 1939
Generaloberst Walter Weiß, 15 January 1941
General der Infanterie Friedrich Wiese, 15 April 1942
Generalleutnant Johannes de Boer, 5 August 1943
Generalmajor Heinz Kokott, 10 August 1944

Operational history
The 26th Infantry Division spent the early war years on the Western Front, taking part in the Battle of France in May/June 1940, first under the command of the Sixteenth Army (16. Armee) and later the Twelfth Army. The division was transferred to the Eastern Front in June 1941 to serve under Army Group Centre (Heeresgruppe Mitte). It participated in the Battle of Kursk in July 1943. After this action the 26th Infantry Division absorbed the 174th Reserve Division (174. Reserve-Division). The division was disbanded after casualties were sustained near Kowel on September 10, 1944; surviving troops were transferred to the 253rd Infantry Division (253. Infanterie-Division).

A new 26th Volksgrenadier Division was formed on September 17, 1944, in the Warthelager (now Biedrusko in west central Poland), near Poznań by absorption of the 582nd Volksgrenadier Division and remnants of the old 26th Infantry Division. This new division spent the rest of the war on the Western Front under Army Group B (Heeresgruppe B) until it entered U.S. captivity in the Harz in 1945.

Organisation

1939
 Infanterie-Regiment 39, I-III Battalions
 Infanterie-Regiment 77, I-III Battalions 
 Infanterie-Regiment 78, I-III Battalions
 Artillerie-Regiment 26, I-III Battalions plus the Ist Battalion of Artillerie-Regiment 62
 Aufklärungs-Abteilung 26
 Panzerjäger-Abteilung 26
 Pionier-Abteilung 26
 Infanterie-Divisions-Nachrichten-Abteilung 26
 Feldersatz-Bataillon 26

1944
 Füsilier Regiment 39, I and II Battalions
 Grenadier Regiment 77, I and II Battalions
 Füsilier Regiment 78, I and II Battalions
 Artillerie-Regiment 26, I-IV Battalions
 Divisions-Füsilier-Kompanie 26  (later expanded to Füsilier-Bataillon 26)
 Panzer-Jäger-Abteilung 26
 Pionier-Abteilung 26
 Infanterie-Divisions-Nachrichten-Abteilung 26
 Feldersatz-Bataillon 26

See also
 26th Division (German Empire) for the eponymous division in the First World War

References
 
 

Military units and formations disestablished in 1945
0*026
0*026